Hong Kong Junior Shield was a football competition in Hong Kong established in 1922. All teams in the Second Division and the Third Division were included in the competition.

South China was the most successful club, winning 9 titles.

History
Hong Kong Junior Challenge Shield was founded by the Hong Kong Football Association in 1922. The first champion was King's Own Rifles. Athletic, champions of 1927–28, were the first Chinese team to win the Junior Challenge Shield.

The Junior Shield was replaced by the Hong Kong FA Cup Preliminary Round after the 2012–13 season, designed to allow lower division clubs to qualify for the tournament proper.

Champions

See also
 Hong Kong Senior Challenge Shield
 Hong Kong FA Cup Preliminary Round

References

Junior Challenge Shield
Hong Kong Second Division League
Hong Kong Third Division League
Hong Kong Fourth Division League